Tropical vegetation is any vegetation in tropical latitudes. Plant life that occurs in climates that are warm year-round is in general more biologically diverse that in other latitudes. Some tropical areas may receive abundant rain the whole year round, but others have long dry seasons which last several months and may vary in length and intensity with geographic location. These seasonal droughts have great impact on the vegetation, such as in the Madagascar spiny forests. Rainforest vegetation is categorized by five layers.  The top layer being the upper tree layer.  Here you will find the largest and widest trees in all the forest.  These trees tend to have very large canopy's so they can be fully exposed to sunlight.  A layer below that is the middle tree layer.  Here you will find more compact trees and vegetation.  These trees tend to be more skinny as they are trying to gain any sunlight they can. The third layer is the lower tree area.  These trees tend to be around five to ten meters high and tightly compacted. The trees found in the third layer are young trees trying to grow into the larger canopy trees. The fourth layer is the shrub layer beneath the tree canopy. This layer is mainly populated by sapling trees, shrubs, and seedlings. The fifth and final layer is the herb layer which is the forest floor.  The forest floor is mainly bare except for various plants, mosses, and ferns. The forest floor is much more dense than above because of little sunlight and air movement.

Plant species native to the tropics found in tropical ecosystems are known as tropical plants. Some examples of tropical ecosystem are the Guinean Forests of West Africa, the Madagascar dry deciduous forests and the broadleaf forests of the Thai highlands and the El Yunque National Forest in the Puerto Rico.

Description

The term "tropical vegetation" is frequently used in the sense of lush and luxuriant, but not all the vegetation of the areas of the Earth in tropical climates can be defined as such. Despite lush vegetation, often the soils of tropical forests are low in nutrients making them quite vulnerable to slash-and-burn deforestation techniques, which are sometimes an element of shifting cultivation agricultural systems.
Tropical vegetation may include the following habitat types:

Tropical rainforest
Tropical rainforest ecosystems include significant areas of biodiversity, often coupled with high species endemism. Rainforests are home to half of all the living animal and plant species on the planet and roughly two-thirds of all flowering plants can be found in rainforests. The most representative are the Borneo rainforest, one of the oldest rainforests in the world, the Brazilian and Venezuelan Amazon Rainforest, as well as the eastern Costa Paulon rainforests.

Tropical seasonal forest
Seasonal tropical forests generally receive high total rainfall, averaging more than 1000 mm per year, but with a distinct dry season. They include: the Congolian forests, a broad belt of highland tropical moist broadleaf forest which extends across the basin of the Congo River; Central American tropical forests in Panama and Nicaragua; the seasonal forests that predominate across much the Indian subcontinent, Indochina, and northern Australia: Queensland.

Tropical dry broadleaf forest
Tropical dry broadleaf forests are territories with a forest cover that is not very dense and has often an unkempt, irregular appearance, especially in the dry season. This type of forest often includes bamboo and teak as the dominant large tree species, such as in the Phi Pan Nam Range, part of the Central Indochina dry forests. They are affected by often long seasonal dry periods and, though less biologically diverse than rainforests, tropical dry forests are home to a wide variety of wildlife.

Tropical grasslands, savannas, and shrublands
Tropical grasslands, savannas, and shrublands are spread over a large area of the tropics with a vegetation made up mainly of low shrubs and grasses, often including sclerophyll species. Some of the most representative are the Western Zambezian grasslands in Zambia and Angola, as well as the Einasleigh upland savanna in Australia and the Everglades in United States of America. Tree species such as Acacia and baobab may be present in these ecosystems depending on the region.

See also
Biocoenosis
Ecoregion
Jungle
Vegetation type

Further reading
Archibold, O. W. Ecology of World Vegetation. New York: Springer Publishing, 1994.
Barbour, M.G, J.H. Burk, and W.D. Pitts. "Terrestrial Plant Ecology". Menlo Park: Benjamin Cummings, 1987.
Breckle, S-W. Walter's Vegetation of the Earth. New York: Springer Publishing, 2002.
Van der Maarel, E. Vegetation Ecology. Oxford: Blackwell Publishers, 2004.
Geoff Tracey The Vegetation of the Humid Tropical Region of North Queensland. Australia: CSIRO 1982.
Stork, N. E. & Turton, Stephen M.  (2008).  Living in a dynamic tropical forest landscape.  Malden, MA :  Blackwell Pub.
 Leonard Webb A Physiognomic Classification of Australian Rain Forests Journal of Ecology Vol. 47, No. 3, pp. 551-570 (British Ecological Society), 1959

References

External links
Classifying Vegetation Condition: Vegetation Assets States and Transitions (VAST)

Botany
Ecology
Biology terminology